N,N'-diacetyllegionaminate synthase (neuB (gene), legI (gene)) is an enzyme with systematic name phosphoenolpyruvate:2,4-diacetamido-2,4,6-trideoxy-alpha-D-mannopyranose 1-(2-carboxy-2-oxoethyl)transferase. This enzyme catalyses the following chemical reaction

 2,4-diacetamido-2,4,6-trideoxy-alpha-D-mannopyranose + phosphoenolpyruvate + H2O  N,N'-diacetyllegionaminate + phosphate

This enzyme requires a divalent metal such as Mn2+.

References

External links 
 

EC 2.5.1